The 2022 Première ligue de soccer du Québec season was the eleventh season of play for the Première ligue de soccer du Québec, a Division 3 semi-professional soccer league in the Canadian soccer pyramid and the highest level of soccer based in the Canadian province of Québec. 

FC Laval won their first league title and qualified for the 2023 Canadian Championship, while AS Blainville won the Coupe PLSQ for the third time. CS Mont-Royal Outremont competed in the 2022 Canadian Championship as the league's representative as 2021 league champions.

Changes from 2021 
The 2022 season will have its greatest number of participating teams with 12 teams. CS Saint-Laurent and the CF Montréal Reserves join as expansion franchises. CS Lanaudière-Nord (who previously competed in the PLSQ until 2015 as FC L'Assomption-Lanaudière prior to their merger with ARS Laser) returns to the league, replacing the district team FC Lanaudière. CS Monteuil became AS Laval following a merger with another non-PLSQ club. Ottawa South United will return to the league full-time after being forced to withdraw midway through the 2021 season due to the COVID-19 pandemic.

Each team will play each other home and away for a 22 match season. The league champion will qualify for the 2023 Canadian Championship and the top four teams will qualify for the Coupe PLSQ.

Main Division

Teams
Twelve teams will participate in the 2022 season. The league champion will earn a place in the 2023 Canadian Championship.

Standings 
<div style=display:inline-table>

Note: The match on October 1 between CS Mont-Royal Outremont and CS Saint-Laurent was abandoned before completion and initially recorded as a double forfeit (CSMRO had been leading 2-1 at the time of abandonment). After an appeal, the match was changed to a 3-0 forfeit victory for CS Mont-Royal Outremont.

Top scorers

Awards

Coupe PLSQ 

Semi-finals

Final

Friendlies
In July and August, HFX Wanderers U23, the U23 side of Canadian Premier League club HFX Wanderers FC, and Sunderland U21, the U21 side of English Championship side Sunderland each played two friendly matches against PLSQ opposition.

Reserve Division
The league will operate a reserve division. Each team, apart from the CF Montréal Academy, will operate a reserve team, playing each other home-and-away. CS St-Hubert, RS Beauport, and Celtix du Haut-Richelieu withdrew from the division in September, with their final matches awarded as forfeit losses.

Note:The match on September 3 between CS St-Hubert and Celtix du Haut-Richelieu resulted in a double forfeit.

Awards

References

2022 in Canadian soccer
2022
Quebec M